Ghaletole is a village in the Kanepokhari Rural Municipality in the Morang District of Province No. 1, south-eastern Nepal.

Location

Ghaletole is in Nepal, Province 1, Morang, Kanepokhari.
The Köppen climate classification is Cwa: Monsoon-influenced humid subtropical climate.

References

Kanepokhari Rural Municipality